The following is a list of events, births, and deaths in 1928 in Switzerland.

Incumbents
Federal Council:
Giuseppe Motta 
Edmund Schulthess 
Jean-Marie Musy 
Heinrich Häberlin 
Marcel Pilet-Golaz
Robert Haab (President) 
Karl Scheurer

Sports
11–19 February – The Winter Olympics take place in St. Moritz.
1928–29 Swiss Serie A

Establishments
Postal Telegraph and Telephone (Switzerland)
Schweizeische Ausstellung für Frauenarbeit (SAFFA)

Events
28 October – In the 1928 Swiss federal election, the Social Democratic Party receives the most votes, but the Free Democratic Party remains the largest party in the National Council, winning 58 of the 198 seats. 
unknown date – The Maximag car ceases production in Switzerland.

Births
7 July – Paul Wyss, politician
29 August – Herbert Meier, author and translator (d. 2018)

References

 
Years of the 20th century in Switzerland